Forever Young may refer to:

Film, television and radio
 Forever Young, a 1981 American documentary directed by Robin Lehman
 Forever Young (1983 film), a British television film directed by David Drury
 Forever Young (1992 film), an American film directed by Steve Miner
 Forever Young (2014 film), a Chinese film directed by Lu Gengxu
 Forever Young (2015 film), a Chinese film directed by He Jiong 
 Forever Young (2016 film), an Italian film directed by Fausto Brizzi
 Forever Young (2018 film), a Chinese film directed by Li Fangfang
 Forever Young (2022 film), a French film directed by Valeria Bruni Tedeschi
 Forever Young (American TV series), a 2013 American reality TV series
 Forever Young (2014 TV series), a 2014–2017 Vietnamese and South Korean drama TV series
 Forever Young, a South African TV program on Vuzu
 "Forever Young" (Grey's Anatomy), an episode of Grey's Anatomy
 Pepper Young's Family, previously Forever Young, a 1932–1959 American radio program

Music
 Alphaville (band), originally Forever Young, a German synth-pop band

Albums
 Forever Young (Alphaville album) or the title song (see below), 1984
 Forever Young (Jacob Young album), 2014
 Forever Young (James Young album), 1988
 Forever Young (Kaysha album), 2009
 Forever Young (Kitty Wells album), 1974
 Forever Young (EP), by Sam Concepcion, 2011
 Forever Young: The Ska Collection or the title song (see below), by Madness, 2012
 Forever Young, an upcoming project by Lil Uzi Vert, 2021

Songs
 "Forever Young" (Alphaville song), 1984; also covered by Interactive (1994), Youth Group (2006), and others
 "Forever Young" (Blackpink song), 2018
 "Forever Young" (Bob Dylan song), 1974; also covered by Joan Baez (1974), Louisa Johnson (2015), and others
 "Forever Young" (Madness song), 2010
 "Forever Young" (Rod Stewart song), 1988
 "Forever Young", by Lil Yachty from Teenage Emotions, 2017
 "Forever Young", by Sparks from Introducing Sparks, 1977
 "Forever Young", by Tyketto, 1991
 "Forever Young", from the film Care Bears Movie II: A New Generation, 1986

See also
 Forever Malcolm Young, an album by Frenzal Rhomb, or the title song, 2006
 Young Forever (disambiguation)
 Eternal youth
 Immortality